The Lamb is a 1918 American short comedy film starring Harold Lloyd. It is believed to be lost. Like many American films of the time, The Lamb was subject to cuts by city and state film censorship boards. The Chicago Board of Censors required cuts of the first, fourth, and sixth tough dancing scenes and of the men wiggling their backs in comedy duel scenes.

Cast
 Harold Lloyd as The Boy
 Snub Pollard 
 Bebe Daniels 
 William Blaisdell
 Sammy Brooks
 Billy Fay
 Oscar Larson
 Gus Leonard
 Edith Sinclair
 William Strohbach (as William Strawback)
 Dorothea Wolbert

See also
 Harold Lloyd filmography
 List of lost films

References

External links

1918 films
1918 short films
1918 lost films
1918 comedy films
American silent short films
American black-and-white films
Films directed by Gilbert Pratt
Films directed by Harold Lloyd
Lost American films
Silent American comedy films
American comedy short films
Lost comedy films
Censored films
1910s American films
1910s English-language films